Ernest Calvin Williams (August 2, 1887 – July 31, 1940) was a United States Marine Corps officer who received the Medal of Honor for his actions on November 29, 1916, during the Battle of San Francisco de Macoris. Then 1st Lt Williams, leading 12 Marines, charged and captured the fortress from a numerically superior enemy.   These actions were part of the U.S. occupation of the Dominican Republic. He was later awarded the Navy Cross.

Medal of Honor citation
Rank and organization: 
First Lieutenant, U.S. Marine Corps. 
Born: August 2, 1887, Broadwell, Illinois 
Accredited to: Illinois. G.O. No.: 289, April 27, 1917. 
Other Navy award: Navy Cross.

Citation:

In action against hostile forces at San Francisco de Macoris, Dominican Republic, 29 November 1916. With only a dozen men available, First Lieutenant Williams rushed the gate of the fortress. With eight of his party wounded by rifle fire of the defenders, he pressed on with four remaining men, threw himself against the door just as it was being closed by the Dominicans and forced an entry. Despite a narrow escape from death at the hands of a rifleman, he and his men disposed of the guards and within a few minutes had gained control of the fort and the hundred prisoners confined there.

See also

List of Medal of Honor recipients

Notes

References

1887 births
1940 deaths
United States Marine Corps Medal of Honor recipients
Recipients of the Navy Cross (United States)
People from Logan County, Illinois
United States Marine Corps colonels
Recipients of the Silver Star
Occupation of the Dominican Republic recipients of the Medal of Honor
American military personnel of the Banana Wars
United States Marine Corps personnel of World War I
Military personnel from Illinois